Sid Ali Lamri (born February 3, 1991 in Sétif) is an Algerian football player who plays for Algerian Ligue Professionnelle 1 club USM Khenchela. He plays primarily as a central midfielder.

Club career
Born in Sétif, Lamri started his career in the youth ranks of his hometown club ES Sétif. In 2008, Lamri was a member of Sétif's under-17 team that won the Algerian U17 Cup, and followed that up two years later with the Algerian U20 Cup trophy with Setif's under-20 team.

In 2014, Lamri played a key role in Sétif's 2014 CAF Champions League triumph, starting in first the leg of the final against AS Vita Club, which ended 2-2, and coming as a substitute in the return leg.

Honours
ES Sétif
 CAF Champions League (1): 2014
 CAF Super Cup: 2015
 Algerian Ligue 1 (2): 2014–15, 2016–17

CS Constantine
 Algerian Ligue 1 (1): 2017–18

References

External links
 
 

1991 births
Algerian footballers
Algerian Ligue Professionnelle 1 players
ES Sétif players
MSP Batna players
Footballers from Sétif
Living people
CS Constantine players
Algerian Ligue 2 players
Association football midfielders
21st-century Algerian people